Kofi Twumasi (born 30 August 1996) is a Ghanaian professional footballer who plays as a midfielder for MLS Next Pro side Atlanta United 2. He is the brother of Kwadwo Twumasi who also played in Romania at Farul Constanța.

References

External links
 
 
 

1996 births
Living people
Footballers from Kumasi
American sportspeople of Ghanaian descent
Ghanaian American
Ghanaian footballers
Association football midfielders
Liga I players
Liga II players
Regionalliga players
FC Viitorul Constanța players
FC Universitatea Cluj players
Rot-Weiß Oberhausen players
VfB Homberg players
Atlanta United 2 players
Ghanaian expatriate footballers
Ghanaian expatriate sportspeople in the United States
Expatriate soccer players in the United States
Ghanaian expatriate sportspeople in Romania
Expatriate footballers in Romania
Ghanaian expatriate sportspeople in Germany
Expatriate footballers in Germany